The Pātea River is in Taranaki in the North Island of New Zealand. It runs for 105 kilometres from the eastern slopes of Mount Taranaki, passing east through Stratford before swinging south and reaching the South Taranaki Bight near the town of Patea.

The river was the original portal to South Taranaki for both Māori and Europeans. In the early days of colonial New Zealand, the Pātea River defined the boundary between New Ulster Province and New Munster Province (from 1841 to 1853—refer to Provinces of New Zealand).

Many enjoy canoeing in the Pātea River—it is the only navigable river in South Taranaki.

Lake Rotorangi on the river is the longest man-made lake in New Zealand (46 km), formed when the Egmont Electric Power Board built the Patea Dam in 1980–84. The interesting southern access drive is via Ball Road through Alton and Hurleyville. There is a camping site with toilet facilities at the dam.

South Taranaki District
Stratford District, New Zealand
Rivers of Taranaki
Rivers of New Zealand
Patea